The Blue River Conference was an IHSAA-sanctioned conference that originally began as the Crawford County Conference. The small membership decided to join with schools from neighboring Harrison and Perry counties in 1959, changing to the Blue River Conference moniker. Originally consisting of smaller schools in the area, but as member schools consolidated mostly with each other, the schools became larger while the membership shrank. The only two non-consolidation additions were North Central in 1962, and Cannelton in 1974. Membership had shrank to five schools in 1976 when four schools combined to form Crawford County. The discrepancy in size between the schools caused its demise in 1979, as the schools moved to the Patoka Lake, Southern, and Three Rivers conferences.

Membership

 Played concurrently in CCC and Southern Monon Conference 1957–59.
 Played concurrently in BRC and HCC 1959–62.
 Played concurrently in BRC and PCC 1959–62.

Resources 
 Past and Present Conferences

Indiana high school athletic conferences
High school sports conferences and leagues in the United States
Indiana High School Athletic Association disestablished conferences
1959 establishments in Indiana
1979 disestablishments in Indiana